The northern pocket gopher (Thomomys talpoides) is a small gopher species native to the western United States and the Canadian provinces of Alberta, Saskatchewan, British Columbia, and Manitoba.

Description
Northern gophers are often rich brown or yellowish brown, but also grayish or closely approaching local soil color and have white markings under the chin. They also weigh less than a quarter of a pound (110 grams).

Habitat
Their habitat consists usually of good soil in meadows or along streams; most often in mountains, but also in lowlands. Northern pocket gophers rarely appear above ground; when they do, they rarely venture more than 2.5 feet from a burrow entrance. Underground, however, they often have tunnels that extend hundreds of feet where they live, store food, and mate.

Interactions
According to the “Journal of Mammalogy,” although there are positive impacts of burrowing, this change can negatively impact the organisms around them. Even though these gophers do not directly interact with the insects in their habitats, burrowing and grazing have an impact on the plants around them and the herbivores that consume these plants. Changes in the plants’ composition can cause an increase in soluble amino acids, carbohydrates, chemicals, which then causes the plants to be more vulnerable: to parasites, predation, and diseases. The “Journal of Mammalogy” publishes different papers and articles surrounding mammals and their aspects of the biology of the mammals in the world today.

References

Northern Pocket
Mammals of the United States
Northern Pocket
Rodents of North America
Northern Pocket
Northern Pocket
Mammals described in 1828
Least concern biota of the United States